Gedalia Suchowolski (born 1928) is an Israeli painter and sculptor known by his nickname Sucho.

Gedalia (Sucho) Suchowolski was born in Białystok, Poland. He immigrated to Mandate Palestine in 1941 and studied construction engineering at Technion – Israel Institute of Technology in Haifa, Israel.

Outdoor sculpture

 Untitled 1970 sculpture, Tel Aviv University
 Untitled 1971 sculpture, Tel Aviv University
 1976 play sculpture, Water Reservoir, Givat Shapira
 1982 mobile sculpture, Yemin Moshe, Jerusalem
 Jerusalem, 1976, French Hill, Jerusalem

References
 The Israel Museum

1928 births
Living people
Modern sculptors
Jewish sculptors
Israeli sculptors
People from Białystok
People from Tel Aviv
Polish emigrants to Mandatory Palestine
Technion – Israel Institute of Technology alumni